Ornativalva heluanensis is a moth of the family Gelechiidae. It was described by Debski in 1913. It is found in Spain, Croatia, Ukraine and Russia, as well as on the Canary Islands, Sicily, Malta and Cyprus. Outside Europe, it is found in North Africa (Morocco, Algeria, Tunisia, Libya, Egypt), Sudan, Israel, Syria, Turkey, Saudi Arabia, Iraq, Iran, Afghanistan, Pakistan and Mongolia.

The wingspan is about 10 mm.

The larvae feed on Frankenia pallida, Tamarix tetragyna and Tamarix nilotica.

References

 "Ornativalva heluanensis (Debski, 1913)". Insecta.pro. Retrieved February 5, 2020.

Moths described in 1913
Ornativalva
Moths of Europe
Insects of Turkey